Lewinella persica  is a bacterium from the genus of Lewinella which has been isolated from mud from Galway in Ireland. 0

References

Further reading

External links
Type strain of Lewinella persica at BacDive -  the Bacterial Diversity Metadatabase

Bacteroidota
Bacteria described in 1970